The 1924–25 NCAA men's basketball season began in December 1924, progressed through the regular season and conference tournaments, and concluded in March 1925.

Season headlines 

 Washburn won the annual Amateur Athletic Union basketball tournament — which included both collegiate and amateur non-collegiate teams — becoming the fourth and final college team to do so.
 In February 1943, the Helms Athletic Foundation retroactively selected Princeton as its national champion for the 1924–25 season.
 In 1995, the Premo-Porretta Power Poll retroactively selected Princeton as its national champion for the 1924–25 season.

Conference membership changes

Regular season

Conference winners and tournaments

Statistical leaders

Awards

Helms College Basketball All-Americans 

The practice of selecting a Consensus All-American Team did not begin until the 1928–29 season. The Helms Athletic Foundation later retroactively selected a list of All-Americans for the 1924–25 season.

Major player of the year awards 

 Helms Player of the Year: Earl Mueller, Colorado College (retroactive selection in 1944)

Coaching changes

References